Cephetola subgriseata is a butterfly in the family Lycaenidae. It is found in Cameroon, the Central African Republic, the Democratic Republic of the Congo, Uganda and Tanzania.

References

Butterflies described in 1964
Poritiinae